Namitha Vankawala is an Indian actress, model and politician who predominantly works in Tamil and Telugu cinema along with a few films in Kannada and Malayalam. She serves as a state executive member of the Bhartiya Janata Party (BJP) in Tamil Nadu.

Career

2001−2008
Starting her career as a beauty pageant contestant, Namitha was crowned Miss Surat during the year of 1998 at the age of 17. She went on to participate in the 2001 Miss India pageant and ended up as the third runner-up, while Celina Jaitley was crowned Miss India. The publicity she garnered during the competition prompted her to move to Mumbai and subsequently she did a number of TV commercials such as Himani cream and hand soap, Arun Ice Creams, Manikchand Gutka, and Nile Herbal Shampoo early in her career. Unable to make a breakthrough into the Hindi film industry, she enrolled in an English Literature course and then considered returning to Surat but chose to later accept an invitation to audition for a Telugu film. After being selected, she consequently made her acting debut in Sreenu Vaitla's coming-of-age romantic film, Sontham (2002). Her next film, Saran's big budget action film Gemeni (2002) opposite Venkatesh, garnered her further attention and her portrayal of a Marwardi girl won critical acclaim. She had also briefly given herself the stagename of "Bhairavi" for the film, but later reverted to her original name.

In the mid-2000s, she quickly became popular in Tamil language films with her mature look and tall frame prompting film makers to cast her opposite ageing actors such as Vijayakanth, Sathyaraj, Arjun, Parthiban, Sundar C and Sarathkumar. She appeared in a series of commercial action films opposite such actors, including roles in Aai (2005), Chanakya (2005) and Aanai (2005). Likewise, she was regularly cast in comedy films with senior actors too, making appearances in Siddique's Engal Anna (2004) and six of Sakthi Chidambaram's comedy dramas. During the period, she appeared in her first Hindi film Love Ke Chakkar Mein, worked on a Kannda film titled Namitha I Love You and shot for an English film, Maya, which was later released in 2008 as Kamasutra Nights. In 2007, she had the opportunity to work with two leading actors from Tamil cinema, respectively appearing with Vijay in the A. R. Rahman-musical Azhagiya Tamil Magan (2007) and Ajith Kumar in Vishnuvardhan's gangster film Billa (2007). By the end of the period, Namitha had developed a "cult following" in Tamil Nadu as a result of her glamorous appearances in films, with the media regularly looking to feature her in reports and Behindwoods.com labelled her "omnipotent and omnipresent".

2009−present
However, by the turn of the decade, Namitha's popularity began to decline after several of her films failed to perform well and the South Indian film industry moved away from casting women in outright glamorous roles, a character that Namitha had become famed for performing. Film makers were also reluctant to cast Namitha opposite young male actors, as the older generation began to stop appearing in leading roles. She was relegated to increasingly smaller roles and guest appearances, while the big-budget horror film, Jaganmohini (2009), where she played the title role performed poorly at the box office. Likewise, she became engaged in disputes with her filmmakers, with the director of Azhagana Ponnuthan (2010), criticising the actress's lack of cooperation for the film's failure. She briefly prioritized her work in Kannada films in the early 2010s, while several of her films endured production delays including Ilamai Oonjal (2016). After several years without any film releases, she announced plans of making a comeback in 2016.

In 2017, Namitha appeared on the Tamil reality television show, Bigg Boss hosted by Kamal Haasan. During her stint in the show, she was widely criticised for her harsh treatment of actress Oviya. Her upcoming projects include T. Rajender's Indraya Kadhal Da, where she plays the antagonist.

In the media
At the height of her success in 2008, Namitha's devotee built her a temple near Coimbatore, Tamil Nadu. She became the second actress after Khushbu in the state to be immortalised in such a fashion by her fan following. In October 2010, there was an attempt to kidnap her by a fan at Trichy in Tamil Nadu. In 2012, the actress was chosen by Tokyo TV, a Japanese media station, as the "most beautiful person" in India. She has been an advocate of safe driving and in June 2012, she and Tamil actor Bharat promoted awareness of safe driving.

Politics
Namitha joined AIADMK on 24 April 2016 in the presence of party general secretary and Tamil Nadu chief minister J Jayalalithaa in Trichy.In 2019, Namitha along with actor Radha Ravi joined the Bharatiya Janata Party in the presence of party's national president J. P. Nadda in Chennai. In July 2020, after 8 months of joining the BJP, Namitha was appointed as one of the state executive member of the BJP in Tamil Nadu.

Personal life
Namitha married businessman Veerendra Chowdary in Tirupathi in November 2017. The couple announced their pregnancy via Namitha's Instagram on her 41st birthday. She delivered twin sons in August 2022.

Filmography

Television

References

External links

 
 
 

Actresses from Gujarat
Indian film actresses
Female models from Gujarat
Living people
People from Surat
Gujarati people
Actresses in Tamil cinema
Actresses in Kannada cinema
Actresses in Telugu cinema
Actresses in Malayalam cinema
Actresses in Gujarati cinema
21st-century Indian actresses
1981 births
Bigg Boss (Tamil TV series) contestants